José María Rómulo Díaz de la Vega Fuentes (23 May 1800 — 3 October 1877) as commander of the garrison in Mexico City was the de facto president of Mexico in 1855 after the resignation of President Martin Carrera during the revolutionary Plan of Ayutla left a power vacuum.

Biography
He studied military science and rose to the rank of general.

In 1821, he joined the Plan of Iguala. He fought in the Texas War of Independence and for that he was appointed lieutenant. He fought in 1838 against the French invasion during the Pastry War. He also fought in the Mexican-American war and he was captured at the Battle of Resaca de la Palma on May 9, 1846.

Díaz de la Vega was military commander of Puebla in 1849 and Tamaulipas in 1850 and then Governor of Yucatán in 1853.

When Martín Carrera left the presidency of the Republic in 1855, Díaz de la Vega, supported by the leaders of the military garrison, assumed the duties of President until the revolutionary leader Juan Alvarez arrived at Mexico City to assume the presidency. His government lasted 22 days, from 12 September to 3 October 1855. 
 
After his presidency, Díaz de la Vega was a member of the Assembly of Notables who invited Maximilian of Habsburg to be emperor in 1863. After the triumph of the Republic, he was sentenced to two years imprisonment, but the penalty was switched by confinement in Puebla, where he died in October 1877, exactly twenty-two years to the day his tenure as president ended.

See also

List of heads of state of Mexico

References

External links

Presidents of Mexico
1800 births
1877 deaths
19th-century Mexican people
Politicians from Mexico City
Second French intervention in Mexico